Bailey Brook is a  long tributary to West Branch French Creek that is classed as a 1st order stream on the EPA waters geoviewer site.

Course
Bailey Brook rises in Venango Township of eastern Erie County, Pennsylvania and then flows southwest to meet West Branch French Creek near Lowville.

Watershed
Bailey Brook drains  of Erie Drift Plain (glacial geology).  The watershed receives an average of 46.6 in/year of precipitation and has a wetness index of 423.76.  The watershed is about 54% forested.

References

Rivers of Pennsylvania
Tributaries of the Allegheny River
Rivers of Erie County, Pennsylvania